Patrick McConville (25 March 1902 – after 1932) was an Irish professional footballer who made 138 appearances in the Football League playing for Lincoln City. He played as a full back, predominantly as a left back. He also played in Ireland for Portadown Celtic and Glenavon.

Life and career
McConville was born in Gilford, County Down, and played football for Portadown Celtic and Glenavon before moving to England to join Third Division North club Lincoln City in 1925. He spent seven seasons with Lincoln, contributing to their divisional title in 1931–32. He made 145 appearances in senior competition without scoring, before returning to Glenavon in 1932.

References

1902 births
Year of death missing
People from County Down
Irish association footballers (before 1923)
Association football fullbacks
Glenavon F.C. players
Lincoln City F.C. players
English Football League players
Place of death missing